Thanasis Papazoglou (  (15 March 1953 – 6 January 2021) was a Greek football defender.

References

1953 births
2021 deaths
Greek footballers
Aris Thessaloniki F.C. players
PAS Giannina F.C. players
Trikala F.C. players
Association football defenders
Greece international footballers
Super League Greece players
Footballers from Thessaloniki